OnDemand is a brand name for a video-on-demand, London-based company owned by the On Demand Group, who provide mobile video services such as pay-per-view to over 25 million subscribers. Their product is sold through middleware to smart TV companies such as Panasonic.

They have teamed up with Hollywood companies such as Twentieth Century Fox Home Entertainment to supply their services across multiple platforms for TV, broadband and mobile, and across multi-territories in partnership with companies such as Virgin Media. Together with Inview Technology they are providing viewers with access to movies on a transactional video-on-demand (TVOD) basis, and a library of on-demand TV content available on an SVOD basis including TV series, children's programming, classic movies and music videos.

See also

 10-foot user interface
 Enhanced TV
 Second screen
 C-Cast
 Home theater PC
 Interactive television
 Hotel television systems
 Hybrid Broadcast Broadband TV
 List of digital distribution platforms for mobile devices
 Non-linear media
 Over-the-top content
 TV Genius
 Smartphone
 Tivoization

References

External links
Official Website

Information appliances
Digital television
Film and video technology
Interactive television
Internet broadcasting
Streaming television
Multimedia
Peercasting
Streaming media systems
Video on demand services
Television technology
Television terminology
English brands